Sinirhodobacter hungdaonensis is a bacterium from the genus of Sinirhodobacter which has been isolated from activated sludge from a wastewater treatment plant in Huangdao in China.

References 

Rhodobacteraceae